Muhammad Hamid Ali was a former Governor of East Pakistan.

Early life
Ali was born in Lucknow, United Provinces of Agra and Oudh, British Raj on 4 September 1906. On 13 October 1931 he joined the Indian Civil Service.

Career
He was posted to subdivisions and districts in various posts in India. He served as the deputy transport commissioner and deputy secretary. On 28 January 1946 he was the joint secretary in the office of the Prime Minister. On 14 November 1946 he was promoted to additional secretary. On 15 August 1947 he joined the Government of East Bengal as secretary of the Department of Finance and Revenue. He was promoted to chief secretary.

From 1 April 1958 to 3 May 1958 he was the acting governor of East Pakistan. After his term ended he returned to his post of Chief Secretary.

References

1906 births
Governors of East Pakistan
Year of death missing
Politicians from Lucknow